David Gil (born 1 November 1953 in London, United Kingdom) is a linguist specializing in Indonesian and Malay linguistics. His research interests include Malayic comparative linguistics, syntax, semantics, linguistic typology, and language evolution.

Education
In 1972, he received a B.A. in mathematics at the Massachusetts Institute of Technology. He completed his master's degree in linguistics in 1978 at the University of Tel Aviv. In 1982, he defended his PhD thesis Distributive Numerals at the University of California, Los Angeles.

Publications
 Riau Indonesian: A Language without Reference and Predication? (1999)
 Colloquial Indonesian Dialects: How Real Are They? (2003)
 The World Atlas of Language Structures (2005)
 What is Riau Indonesian? (2009)
 Language Complexity as an Evolving Variable (2009)

Conferences
Gil regularly organises academic conferences on the languages of Indonesia, such as the International Symposium on Malay/Indonesian Linguistics (ISMIL), International Symposium on the Languages of Java (ISLOJ), and Workshop on the Languages of Papua (WLP).

References

1953 births
Living people
Linguists of Austronesian languages
Linguists of Papuan languages
Linguists from the United Kingdom
Scientists from London
Massachusetts Institute of Technology School of Science alumni
Tel Aviv University alumni
Max Planck Institute for the Science of Human History
Linguists of Malay
University of California, Los Angeles alumni